Ashley and Weston railway station was a station in Northamptonshire, serving the settlements of Ashley and Weston.

History
The station opened in 1850 on the Rugby and Stamford Railway and was originally named Medbourne Bridge. It was renamed when Medbourne railway station was opened on the Great Northern and London and North Western Joint Railway. 
It later became part of the London and North Western Railway and following the Grouping of 1923 it became part of the London, Midland and Scottish Railway.  The station passed on to the London Midland Region of British Railways on nationalisation in 1948. The station was closed by British Railways for regular passenger services on 18 June 1951 but continued to be used by railway staff until 1952.

Extensive sidings were opened in 1904 to handle the amount of coal coming from Nottinghamshire and Derbyshire. 

The station building survives today as a private residence.

References

 
 Station on navigable 1946 O. S. map

Disused railway stations in Northamptonshire
Former London and North Western Railway stations
Railway stations in Great Britain opened in 1850
Railway stations in Great Britain closed in 1951
1898 establishments in England
1951 disestablishments in England